Dokwa is a village in Rajgarh tehsil of Churu district in Rajasthan.

Location 
Dokwa is situated 51 km northeast of Churu and 8 km west of Rajgarh. Its neighbouring villages are Mundi Tal, Ratanpura and Bhamasi.

Jat Gotras 
Poonia 
Sarawag 
Dhindhwal 
Mahla
Jakhar 
Nehra
Basera 
Kaswan 
Ranwa

Verma Gotras 
Prajapat 
only 
luhaniwal

Population
As of the census of 2011, there are 2315 people, 1177 male and 1138 female.

Economy
The main occupation of the villagers is agriculture. There are many people serving the Armed Forces, Central and State Government services. Many people have gone to Arab countries for work.

Education
Dokwa is considered to be a progressive village of the region. Presently there is a Government Primary School and a Government higher Secondary School. There is a private secondary school also. For Higher Secondary education students go to Rajgarh.there is situated an english medium school ≤euro international kids school dokwa

Religion
All people in the village are Hindu. There is one temple of Hanumanji.

References

Villages in Churu district